Wilhelm Braun (13 July 1897 – 15 November 1969) was a German cross-country skier. He competed in the men's 18 kilometre event at the 1928 Winter Olympics.

References

External links
 

1897 births
1969 deaths
German male cross-country skiers
Olympic cross-country skiers of Germany
Cross-country skiers at the 1928 Winter Olympics
People from Freudenstadt (district)
Sportspeople from Karlsruhe (region)